Paphiopedilum gratrixianum is a species of plant in the family Orchidaceae found from Laos to Vietnam.

References

 Braem, G. & Chiron, G. Paphiopedilum, Tropicalia, France, 2003.
 Cribb, P. The Genus Paphiopedilum, Second Edition, Natural History Publications (Borneo) Sdn. Bhd., 1998.

gratrixianum
Orchids of Laos
Orchids of Vietnam